Salima Ziani (Tifinagh: ⵙⴰⵍⵉⵎⴰ, ; born in 1994) also known as Silya is a Moroccan singer-songwriter, human rights activist, feminist, and ex-political prisoner. She was born and grew up in the Afzar neighborhood of Al Hoceima. She later moved to Imzouren, in the Rif Region, where she's originally from. She is the youngest of six siblings: four sisters and two brothers.

Studies 
She enrolled at Mohammed First University in Oujda, majoring in Amazigh studies.

Music 
Ziani specializes in izran, a traditional form of poetry performed by women, popular throughout the Rif.

Political activism 
Ziani is quoted in an article by Ali Jaouate in al-Aoual saying: "I try, despite the difficulties in this patriarchal society, to constantly establish myself as well as my presence in the Hirak, so that the Rifi woman is present."

At 23 years old, Ziani was arrested after the 20 February 2017 Al Hoceima protests, part of the Hirak Rif. She was later given a royal pardon by King Mohammed VI on July 23, 2017—the 18th anniversary of his ascension to the throne. She was released on July 29, 2017.

References 

Living people
21st-century Moroccan women singers
Moroccan women activists
1994 births